The 1993–94 NBA season was the Bucks' 26th season in the National Basketball Association. In the 1993 NBA draft, the Bucks selected Vin Baker from the University of Hartford with the eighth pick. During the off-season, the team signed free agent Ken Norman. However, the Bucks struggled all season long posting a 10-game losing streak early into the season, and held a 14–34 record at the All-Star break. At midseason, Frank Brickowski was traded to the Charlotte Hornets, while second-year forward Anthony Avent was dealt to the Orlando Magic, and Danny Schayes was sold to the Los Angeles Lakers. The Bucks went on to lose 22 of their final 25 games, including a nine-game losing streak in April, finishing last place in the Central Division with a franchise worst record of 20–62, a record that stood for 20 years until the 2013–14 team posted a 15–67 record during the first year of the future Bucks' superstar Giannis Antetokounmpo era.

Eric Murdock led the team with 15.3 points, 6.7 assists and 2.4 steals per game, while Baker averaged 13.5 points, 7.6 rebounds and 1.4 blocks per game, and was named to the NBA All-Rookie First Team. Second-year guard Todd Day provided the team with 12.7 points and 1.4 steals per game, while Norman provided with 11.9 points and 6.1 rebounds per game, and Blue Edwards contributed 11.6 points per game. Following the season, Norman was traded to the Atlanta Hawks, while Edwards and Derek Strong were both dealt to the Boston Celtics, and Brad Lohaus signed as a free agent with the Miami Heat.

For the season, the Bucks changed their primary logo, which showed a more regal looking buck, ditching their previous logo of a cartoonish buck spinning a basketball. The team also added new uniforms with side panels on their shorts, plus adding purple to their color scheme of dark green. The new logo remained in use until 2006, while the uniforms lasted until 2001, where they added purple, and green side panels to the side of their home and road jerseys respectively.

Draft picks

Roster

Regular season

Season standings

z – clinched division title
y – clinched division title
x – clinched playoff spot

Record vs. opponents

Game log

|-style="background:#bbffbb;"
| 1 || November 5, 1993 || @ Cleveland
| W 94–91
|Ken Norman (24)
|
|
| Coliseum at Richfield17,102
| 1—0
|-style="background:#fcc;"
| 2 || November 6, 1993 || Charlotte
| L 103–120
|Ken Norman (28)
|Anthony Avent (17)
|Eric Murdock, Ken Norman (7)
| Bradley Center18,633
| 1–1
|-style="background:#fcc;"
| 3 || November 8, 1993 || @ Boston
| L 100–108
|
|
|
| Boston Garden14,890
| 1-2
|-style="background:#fcc;"
| 4 || November 10, 1993 || Chicago
| L 90–91
|
|
|
| Bradley Center18,633
| 1–3
|-style="background:#fcc;"
| 5 || November 11, 1993 || @ Miami
| L 103–116
|
|
|
| Miami Arena15,010
| 1-4
|-style="background:#fcc;"
| 6 || November 13, 1993 || @ New York
| L 86–99
|
|
|
| Madison Square Garden19,763
| 1-5
|-style="background:#fcc;"
| 7 || November 16, 1993 || Minnesota
| L 98–102
|
|
|
| Bradley Center13,871
| 1–6
|-style="background:#fcc;"
| 8 || November 17, 1993 || @ Washington
| L 104–117
|
|
|
| US Airways Arena6,817
| 1-7
|-style="background:#fcc;"
| 9 || November 20, 1993 || San Antonio
| L 97–101
|
|
|
| Bradley Center16,365
| 1–8
|-style="background:#fcc;"
| 10 || November 24, 1993 || Atlanta
| L 85—89
|
|
|
| Bradley Center14,801
| 1–9
|-style="background:#fcc;"
| 11 || November 26, 1993 || @ Charlotte
| L 99—110
|
|
|
| Charlotte Coliseum23,698
| 1–10
|-style="background:#bbffbb;"
| 11 || November 27, 1993 || Boston
| W 89–85
|
|
|
| Bradley Center15,127
| 2–10
|-style="background:#fcc;"
| 12 || November 29, 1993 || @ San Antonio
| L 95–102
|
|
|
| Alamodome15,401
| 2-11
|-style="background:#fcc;"
| 13 || November 30, 1993 || @ Houston
| L 91–102
|
|
|
| The Summit14,186
| 2-12

|-style="background:#bbffbb;"
| 15 || December 3, 1993 || @ Dallas
| W 107–106
|
|
|
| Reunion Arena11,690
| 3–12
|-style="background:#fcc;"
| 16 || December 5, 1993 || Phoenix
| L 98–117
|
|
|
| Bradley Center18,255
| 3–13
|-style="background:#fcc;"
| 17 || December 8, 1993 || L. A. Clippers
| L 97–100
|
|
|
| Bradley Center13,287
| 3–14
|-style="background:#bbffbb;"
| 18 || December 10, 1993 || @ Detroit
| W 90–88
|
|
|
| The Palace of Auburn Hills21,454
| 4–14
|-style="background:#fcc;"
| 19 || December 11, 1993 || Philadelphia
| L 86–99
|
|
|
| Bradley Center16,627
| 4–15
|-style="background:#fcc;"
| 20 || December 13, 1993 || @ Phoenix
| L 104–112
|
|
|
| America West Arena19,023
| 4–16
|-style="background:#bbffbb;"
| 21 || December 15, 1993 || @ Sacramento
| W 96–95
|
|
|
| ARCO Arena17,317
| 5–16
|-style="background:#fcc;"
| 22 || December 17, 1993 || @ Seattle
| L 97–127
|
|
|
| Seattle Center Coliseum14,258
| 5–17
|-style="background:#fcc;"
| 23 || December 19, 1993 || @ Portland
| L 81–93
|
|
|
| Memorial Coliseum14,258
| 5–18
|-style="background:#bbffbb;"
| 24 || December 20, 1993 || @ L. A. Clippers
| W 105–92
|
|
|
| Los Angeles Memorial Sports Arena9,553
| 6–18
|-style="background:#bbffbb;"
| 25 || December 22, 1993 || Dallas
| W 96–86
|
|
|
| Bradley Center15,032
| 7–18

|-style="background:#fcc;"
| 31 || January 8, 1994 || New Jersey
| L 87–90
|
|
|
| Bradley Center15,196
| 9–22
|-style="background:#fcc;"
| 32 || January 11, 1994 || Indiana
| L 76–82
|
|
|
| Bradley Center13,364
| 9–24
|-style="background:#fcc;"
| 33 || January 13, 1994 || Utah
| L 83–101
|
|
|
| Bradley Center13,864
| 9–24

Player statistics

Awards and records
 Vin Baker, NBA All-Rookie First Team

Transactions

Trades

Free agents

Player Transactions Citation:

References

See also
 1993–94 NBA season

Milwaukee Bucks seasons
Milwaukee Bucks
Milwaukee Bucks
Milwaukee